Chérrepe is a beach and town in Northern Peru located in the district Pueblo Nuevo in Chepén Province of the region La Libertad. Located some 156 km north of Trujillo, Peru, this town is primarily known for its fishermen and the beach popular with tourists.

Nearby cities
Chepén
Guadalupe
Pacasmayo

See also
Jequetepeque Valley
Pacasmayo
Chepén

External links
Location of Chérrepe by Wikimapia

References

Populated places in La Libertad Region
Beaches of La Libertad Region